Meymand Rural District is a rural district (dehestan) in the Central District of Shahr-e Babak County, Kerman Province, Iran. At the 2006 census, its population was 2,175 in 536 families. The rural district has 36 villages.

References 

Rural Districts of Kerman Province
Shahr-e Babak County